The Chattanooga Car Barns is a three-building complex located at 301 Market St. in Chattanooga, Tennessee.  It was built in 1887 and was listed on the National Register of Historic Places in 1979.

The three buildings include "offices facing Third Street, a fifteen-track car barn, and a bus fueling and storage facility. The
offices and car barn were designed by R.H. Hunt, Architects."

References

National Register of Historic Places in Hamilton County, Tennessee
Buildings and structures completed in 1887